Jean Dunand (1877–1942) was a Swiss and French painter, sculptor, metal craftsman and interior designer during the Art Deco period. He was particularly known for his lacquered screens and other art objects.

Biography 
Jules-John Dunand was born in Lancy, Switzerland, on 20 May 1877.  He later adopted the French first name of Jean, and became a naturalized French citizen in 1922. At the age of fourteen, he began studying sculpture at the Geneva School of Industrial Arts, where he won several prizes and received his diploma. In 1897 he moved to Paris and begn to work as a sculptor and a copper craftsman.  He participated in the 1904 Salon of the National Society of Fine Arts, and in 1905 he was selected a member, after completing an interior for the Countess de Bearn.  He worked with a very wide range of materials, including steel, copper, pewter and silver,  which he worked with hammer and glided, and encrusted with gold or mother-of-pearl, and then often decorated with enamels and patinas.  His works included vases, plates, boxes, and jewelry.

In about 1912, he began working with  Seizo Sugawara, a Japanese lacquer painter who had emigrated to France, and began to use that ancient and almost forgotten technique in his own work, making large decorative panels and screens.  He also sometimes decorated pieces of furniture by other designers, including Jacques-Emile Ruhlmann and Pierre Legrain.  His themes were greatly varied, from floral and animal designs, to a kind of neo-cubism, to oriental designs.

For the 1925 Paris Exposition of Decorative Arts, he worked on one of best-known exhibits, a proposal for the interior of an Art Deco French Embassy, creating a smoking room entirely decorated in lacquered panels. He also contributed to Ruhlmann's House of a Collector.  He contributed to the interiors of many apartments, and of ocean liners;  he decorated the smoking room of the ocean liner .

His works can be found in museums in Amsterdam, Denver, Detroit, Geneva, Lausanne, Le Havre, London, Miami, Minneapolis, New York, Paris, Pittsburg, Quimper, Reims, Richmond, San Francisco, Tokyo and Zurich.

Gallery

Bibliography 

 Félix Marcilhac, Jean Dunand: His Life and Work, London, Thames and Hudson, 1991 
 Exhibition Catalogue "Madeleine Vionnet, Puriste de la Mode", Les Arts décoratifs, Paris, 24-06-2009 - 31-01-2010.
 E. Bénézit, "Dictionary of Artists", Paris 2006, Vol. 4, p. 1338-1339.

References 

French furniture designers
French interior designers
Art Deco designers
1877 births
1942 deaths
Swiss Jews